Bogdan Gheorghe Lazăr (born 26 June 2003) is a Romanian professional footballer who plays as a right back for Liga I side Farul Constanța.

Club career

Viitorul Constanta
He made his league debut on 1 August 2020 in Liga I match against Sepsi OSK.

Career statistics

Club

References

External links
 
 

2003 births
Living people
Sportspeople from Alba Iulia
Romanian footballers
Romania youth international footballers
Association football midfielders
Liga I players
Liga III players
FC Viitorul Constanța players
FCV Farul Constanța players